Deadwater Ait is an island in the River Thames in England on the reach above Romney Lock, near Windsor, Berkshire.

Position and use

The island is an uninhabited tree-covered strip adjacent to the Windsor bank of the river between Windsor Bridge and Windsor Railway Bridge.

Swans, geese and a small number of coots all live on this island.

Barry Avenue Island

It is the same distance from the Windsor bank and has the same use for habitat and wildlife.

See also
Islands in the River Thames

References

Islands of Berkshire
Islands of the River Thames
Windsor, Berkshire